Pierre Vial (born 25 December 1942) is an academic medievalist tied to the Jean Moulin University Lyon 3. A Nouvelle Droite leader, he is the founder of the far-right, neopagan association Terre et Peuple.

Biography 
Pierre Vial was born on 25 December 1942. He was in his youth a contributor in Cahiers universitaires, the magazine of the Federation of Nationalist Students.

He co-founded the Nouvelle Droite think tank GRECE in 1968, serving as its secretary general from 1978 to 1984. Vial promoted a neopagan stance in the vein of Marc "Saint-Loup" Augier.

Vial joined the Front National (FN) in 1988. The same year, he obtained a teaching position at Jean Moulin University Lyon 3. He soon reached the leadership ranks of the FN, serving as a member of the Institute of Formation of the party. However, Vial complained in both GRECE and the FN of a lack of focus on the ethnic dimension of identity, and he eventually decided to establish his own movement Terre et Peuple in 1994, launched publicly in 1995.

In a public declaration delivered at a Terre et Peuple meeting in May 2000, Vial lamented the "ethnic colonization" of France by non-European immigrant communities with a different "biological infrastructure". The "true cultural revolution", Vial ventured, was "the ethnic revolution, the revolution of identity".

References

Bibliography

 
  (adapted from )
 
 
 

1942 births
French modern pagans
Identitarian movement in France
New Right (Europe)
Living people
20th-century French historians
21st-century French historians
French medievalists
Academic staff of the University of Lyon
National Rally (France) politicians